O series or O-series may refer to:
 BL O-series engine – a line of 4-cylinder car engines
 Waco 10 – O-series biplanes
 Tool steel O series, oil hardened

See also
 0 series (disambiguation)
 N series (disambiguation)
 P series (disambiguation)